Sodsai Rungphothong is a Thai Luk thung singer.

Early life 
He was born on 12 May 1950, in Samut Prakan Province. His father was a singer and his mother was a farmer. He graduated from the Faculty of Law at Ramkhamhaeng University.

Career 
His first recording was "Kha Doay Pieang Din", but he became popular with the release of "Rak Jang Thee Bang Ba Khong", which he composed. After this, he became associated with Nithithat A.O.A and Rose Media Entertainment. In 1997, he returned to popularity with "Rak Nong Porn".

In 2007, he became a Democrat Party member of the House of Representatives, and joined the Chartthaipattana Party in 2018.

References

1950 births
Living people
Sodsai Rungphothong
Sodsai Rungphothong
Sodsai Rungphothong